Four Friends may refer to:

"The Four Friends" (also the 4 Friends), a 1950s doo wop band that recorded with Fee Bee Records in Pittsburgh, PA
"The Four Friends", a term used in Sunni Islam to refer to the Rashidun, the first four Caliphs (namely Ali ibn Abi Talib, Abu Bakr, Umar ibn al-Khattab and Uthman ibn Affan)
 Four Friends (1981 film), a 1981 American Comedy-drama film directed by Arthur Penn
 Four Friends (2010 film), a 2010 Indian film in Malayalam language

The Major Failure of Abu Bakr and Umar

The difference between a politician and a statesman, it has been said, is that the politician thinks of the next election, the statesman of the next generation. What it means is that the impact of a politician on the public is transitory whereas that of a statesman is enduring.

In the case of leaders who are dead, people remember them according to whether their actions and ideas changed the course of history, and whether their works have become part of the national heritage.

Abu Bakr and Umar were great statesmen and their actions and ideas changed the course of history. Without a doubt, they were great leaders, conquerors and administrators.

But notwithstanding all the greatness of Abu Bakr and Umar, there is one area in which their vision as statesmen failed them, and it failed them totally. The area in question relates to the leadership of the Muslims. They failed to create an apparatus of succession for the Muslim umma. They failed to develop a system of peaceful transfer of sovereignty from one incumbent to another.

Before Abu Bakr and Umar, their master, Muhammad, the Messenger of God, had designed an apparatus for orderly and peaceful transfer of power. But most unfortunately, they (Abu Bakr and Umar) dismantled it. In its stead, they designed an apparatus of their own. Their apparatus was workable but it had too many “bugs” in it.

In contradistinction to the inspired plan of Muhammad for succession, Abu Bakr and Umar adopted a makeshift system of their own in Saqifa. Their system was successful in the sense that it put power in their hands; first one and then the other of them became the successor of Muhammad. After all, nothing succeeds like succession!

But as events were soon to show, their system was incompatible with a coherent strategy. Coherence, and not visceral ad hoc-ery is the essence of statesmanlike strategy.

When Muhammad, the Apostle of God, died, Abu Bakr and Umar inaugurated the al-Khilafat er-Rashida (the Rightly-Guided Caliphate), and Abu Bakr became the first “rightly-guided caliph.” Two years later, when he was dying, he appointed Umar as his successor who then became the second “rightly-guided caliph.”

Ten years later, Umar lay dying, and he was confronted once again with the problem of transferring power. But all that he did, was to design a jerry-built apparatus to find a leader for the umma even though he had gained long experience of government and politics.

The dismantlement by Abu Bakr and Umar of the apparatus for transfer of power which Muhammad had given to his umma, proved to be the greatest tragedy in the history of Islam.

Maurice Latey, writing about the Roman Emperors, in his book, Patterns of Tyranny, published by Atheneum, New York (1969), says:

“The means color the end: and for all Augustus' statesmanship, the methods by which he seized power, left a fatal flaw in the foundation of his empire which repeatedly shook the edifice and finally destroyed it.”

For all the statesmanship of Abu Bakr and Umar, the methods by which they seized power, left a fatal flaw in the foundations of al-Khilafat er-Rashida, which repeatedly shook the edifice and finally destroyed it.

Al-Khilafat er-Rashida collapsed in the midst of civil wars, assassinations and chaos, just as Umar himself had predicted. Muawiya bin Abu Sufyan, who had been awaiting the opportunity for thirty years, to grab the caliphate, moved in to fill the power vacuum, and he did so with no pretense of piety or even of sanctimony.

As noted before, Muhammad, the Prophet of Islam, was still alive when the potential candidates for power, and their supporters had worked out a plan or a master-plan which was designed to supersede his plan for succession. According to their plan, Abu Bakr was to be the first successor, and Umar and Uthman were to be the second and the third successors of Muhammad. The latter knew what some of his companions were trying to do, and it was because of this knowledge that he placed all of them under the command of Usama bin Zayd bin Haritha, ordered them to leave Medina, and to go on a campaign to the Syrian frontier. But they defied his orders and did not go.

The companions discarded Muhammad's plan for succession, and elevated Abu Bakr to the throne of khilafat. Before his own death, two years later, he appointed Umar as khalifa. Ten years later, when Umar was dying, he “stage-managed” the selection of Uthman as his own successor, as noted before, and the “master-plan” worked with perfect precision.

But there is no way of knowing what did Abu Bakr and Umar think would happen after Uthman. It appears that Umar tried to look beyond Uthman. Thinking of the times after Uthman, he “adopted” Muawiya as his protégé. Just as Muhammad had groomed Ali for ruling the Muslim umma after himself, Umar groomed Muawiya for the same purpose.

Muawiya had heard Umar denouncing the mode of election of Abu Bakr to khilafat as “an unprémeditated affair,” one from the “evil effects” of which God had saved the Muslims.

Therefore, when he became khalifa, he gave a burial to the method by which Abu Bakr was elected khalifa. He abolished the elective systemthus putting an end de jure to the institution which had been deprived of its power de facto by Abu Bakr himself when he designated Umar as his successor instead of leaving the choice of a leader to the Muslim umma.

Muawiya demolished the house built by Abu Bakr and Umar in a reversal of ideology.

Muawiya's rise to power signalized the spectacular failure of the “Islamic” or rather of the Saqifa democracy.

Charles Yost
“Democracy is not a matter of sentiment, but of foresight. Any system that doesn't take the long run into account, will burn itself out in the short run.” (The Age of Triumph and Frustration).

The Saqifa democracy didn't take the long run into account, and burned itself out in the short run, and out of its ashes sprang Muawiya the son of Hinda into super-stardom! Just as Abu Bakr had inaugurated the al-Khilafat er-Rashida, Muawiya inaugurated monarchy, and founded a dynasty. On the ruins of the al-Khilafat er-Rashida, he reared the edifice of the empire of the Umayyads. His political philosophy rested upon long-range, sequential and coherent strategy.

Ninety years later, Muawiya's empire folded up. On the debris of his empire, the Abbasis reared the edifice of their empire. Abbasis also inaugurated dynastic rule, and their political philosophy also rested upon long-range, sequential and coherent strategy, and they ushered in the “Golden Age” of the Arabs.

The Golden Age of any nation symbolizes peace and prosperity. The Golden Age of the Arabs might have brought prosperity to some people but it did not necessarily bring peace to the Muslims. Even when the Abbasi power was at its zenith, their empire did not have any real peace.

G. E. Von Grunebaum

Religion too was the motivation of the uprisings which repeatedly convulsed the Abbasi empire. Even under the first Abbasids, who held power firmly, not a year passed without rebellion of some kind, large or small. (Classical Islam - A History 600-1258, p. 88, 1970).

Warfare inside the Dar-ul-Islam was a norm, and it was expected that wars would take place. The struggle for power was considered normal and inevitable. This struggle was the “legacy” of Saqifa to the Muslims. Most Muslims had become “addicts” of civil war. But if there was no war, it was considered a phenomenon so extraordinary that it boggled belief. Transition of power without bloodshed was considered a “freak.”

G.E. Von Grunebaum

Abu Yaqub Yusuf, the son of Abd al-Mumin (Almohads), took over power without incident. He fell in the holy war before Santarem (Spain) in 1184. The next three rulers also, of whom the most important was Abd al-Mumin's grandson, Yaqub al-Mansur (1184-1199) mounted the throne without having to put down any rebellion, a dynastic stability almost without parallel in the Dar al-Islam. (emphasis added) (Classical Islam - A History 600-1258, p.187, 1970)

A statesman is endowed with a vision that can penetrate generations and even centuries. Almost every nation has produced such statesmen. Those men of the 18th century who drafted the Declaration of American Independence, the Constitution of the United States of America, and the Bill of Rights, were such statesmen. They were prophetic.

They designed apparatus for orderly transfer of power, and by doing so, they saved the American people from the trauma of war and bloodshed. They put “built-in” safeguards in the Constitution so that since 1789, sovereignty has passed from one incumbent or from one party to another without any incident. They condensed in 52 words a Preamble that is the most satisfactory statement of the purpose of government ever written.

RobertB. Downs

The nineteenth-century (American) historian, George Bancroft, believed that the Founding Fathers had acted under divine guidance, that they had been directed by God first to stage a democratic revolution, and then to write a democratic constitution. (Books that Changed America, London, 1970)

Considering the ephemerality of the al-Khilafat er-Rashida, it might appear that it did not have any divine guidance or divine blessing.

On January 20, 1981, Mr. Ronald Reagan, the fortieth President of the United States, said in his inaugural address:

“The orderly transfer of authority as called for in the Constitution takes place as it has for almost two centuries and few of us stop to think how unique we really are. In the eyes of many in the world, this every-four-year ceremony we accept as normal, is nothing less than a miracle.”

The “Founding Fathers” of America achieved this miracle in the 18th century. Twelve centuries before them, Muhammad, the Apostle of God, had achieved the same miracle in Arabia. Here a student of history can see two miracles in “orderly transfer of authority.” But whereas the miracle of the American Founding Fathers turned out to be viable, the miracle of the Arabian Prophet turned out to be “still-born!”

Why?

For a very simple reason, viz., the young American nation gave massive and whole-hearted support to the principles enshrined in the American “miracle” but the key figures in the young Muslim umma withheld their support to the principles enshrined in the Islamic miracle.

As noted before, Muhammad was stymied by his own companions in the execution of his inspired design for orderly transfer of authority in the Kingdom of Heaven on Earth. The latter had a design of their own, and they succeeded in putting it into effect at his death. But with their “success,” they and their proxies opened the Pandora's Box of polarization, confrontation and conflict in the Dar-ul-Islam which took a dreadful toll from the Muslim umma. Countless Muslims were killed in their countless wars which were fought only because there was no apparatus for peaceful transfer of power from one ruler to another.

Many modern historians have noted and have commented upon the paradox of war and bloodshed in the Dar-ul-Islam, i.e. “the House of Peace.”

Sir John Glubb

“Politically, the Muslim states, throughout their long centuries of leadership, constantly were torn by civil wars between rival claimants to rule. We see them once again frequently the scene of internal upheavals and of army seizures of power, precisely as they were 800 years ago Throughout history, Muslim armies have been employed in internal struggles more often than in external wars... “ (The Lost Centuries, 1967)

Another historian has commented upon the political and moral decline of the empire of the Muslims in which young men perished fighting the interminable wars of their rulers, while the rulers themselves rotted away in gilded, bejeweled, be-eunuched palaces.

Herbert J. Muller

They (the Umayyads) established a dynasty, set up a worldly court, introduced eunuchs into their harems, and in general ruled like Oriental kings, no longer associating with their fellows in the manner of Arab chieftains. Church and State, theoretically one, became in fact separate. Islam retained a misty devotion to the theory, but had no real political doctrine.

The Abbasids built a new capital at Baghdad, a cosmopolitan city that became the site of the Arabian Nights, and of a civilization much richer than Arabian. They brought Islam to the summit of its material wealth and power and its cultural creativity, producing the famous symbol of its splendor in the reign of Harun al-Rashid (786-809).

Yet in this reign the basic rottenness of the Abbasid regime was already apparent. Harun had ascended the throne more easily because his brother had been murdered in the harem; he had to contend with many revolts in his empire; and his death was followed by civil war between his sons. The Islamic world shortly began to fall apart, as Persia, Spain, Egypt and other provinces became independent kingdoms. The empire built in the name of Mohammed and Allah had nothing of the staying power of the secular Roman Empire.

Strictly it had never been a real empire with a uniform government. The spiritual unity of Islam failed to inspire political unity; its rulers displayed little political intelligence and less idealism. While the Abbasid caliphs made a show of orthodox piety, most of them were recklessly impious and still more recklessly extravagant, squandering the wealth of Islam in luxurious living. They consciously modeled themselves crowned with the diadem, became increasingly autocratic and remote from their subjects, and made the army their personal property, recruiting it from among foreign slaves.

Another innovation was the executioner who always accompanied them. The founder of the dynasty, Abul Abbas, had taken the name of Bloodspiller; his successors often had their own blood spilled, in assassination resulting from court intrigue. By the tenth century the caliphs of Baghdad were puppets of their “slave” army, lacking any real political or spiritual authority over their dwindling domains. The sorry pretense of their rule was ended in 1031.

More caliphs popped up elsewhere in Islam, as in Egypt and Spain, but they too had only nominal authority. Other Islamic states repeated the Baghdad story of imperial splendor, intrigue, and civil war. An Arabian poet summed up the moral for their subjects: “Get sons - for Death! Build high - for Ruination! March on - this road goes to Annihilation!” (The Loom of History, pp. 286-287, 1958)

Judging by this portrait, peace itself must have been at bay in the House of Peace (Dar-ul-Islam) since bloodshed and war were a far more familiar experience of its citizens. The Muslim umma has indeed paid a very high price for its failure to accept the plan of Muhammad, the Apostle of God, for transfer of authority.